Tricia Chuah, (born 31 October 1982 in Kuala Lumpur) is a professional squash player who represented Malaysia.

Tricia grew up in Kuala Lumpur, Malaysia and started playing squash at the start of her teens. At sixteen, she started to compete internationally.

Tricia was coached by Jamshed Gul as a junior and Raymond Arnold with the Malaysian national squad. As a junior, she won a number of international titles including the Scottish Junior Open, and was a member of the national team which won the Asian Junior Championship twice and participated in the Commonwealth Youth Games in Scotland. As a senior, she won her first WISPA Tour title in 2005 in the Women's Islamic Games and has represented Malaysia in numerous Asian Squash Championships, World Team Squash Championships, the 2006 Commonwealth Games and World Doubles Squash Championships.

References

External links 

Malaysian female squash players
Living people
1982 births
Malaysian people of Chinese descent
Sportspeople from Kuala Lumpur
Southeast Asian Games medalists in squash
Southeast Asian Games gold medalists for Malaysia
Southeast Asian Games silver medalists for Malaysia
Competitors at the 2005 Southeast Asian Games
Squash players at the 2006 Commonwealth Games
Commonwealth Games competitors for Malaysia
21st-century Malaysian women